Fort Deseret is a former fort located in northeastern Millard County, Utah, United States, just south of Deseret.



Description
The fort was built in  1865 during the Utah Black Hawk War to protect settlers in western Utah from the attacks of local Utes. Due to U.S. Army obligations in the Civil War, local settlers were advised to take measures to defend themselves, resulting in the construction of the fort. The 550-foot square fort had 10-foot adobe walls. It proved useful when Black Hawk appeared in 1866 at Deseret demanding cattle. The security provided by the fortification allowed a peaceful settlement to be negotiated. The site was listed on the National Register of Historic Places on October 9, 1970.

See also

 National Register of Historic Places listings in Millard County, Utah
Cove Fort, another fort, also NRHP-listed
Moyle House and Indian Tower, another fort, also NRHP-listed

References

External links

 Fort Deseret at Great Basin Heritage Area Partnership

1865 establishments in Utah Territory
Buildings and structures in Millard County, Utah
Great Basin National Heritage Area
Utah Territory
Deseret
National Register of Historic Places in Millard County, Utah